The Adirondack High Peaks are a set of 46 mountain peaks in the Adirondack Mountains of New York state. They have been popular hiking destinations since the late 1920s, when the list of peaks was published in Russell Carson's book Peaks and Peoples of the Adirondacks. Those who have climbed all 46 High Peaks are eligible to join the Adirondack Forty-Sixers club.

Origin 
The list of peaks was originally compiled by the mountaineers Herbert Clark, Bob Marshall, and George Marshall, with input from Russell Carson. The Marshall brothers wished to climb every notable peak in the Adirondacks, which they accomplished with Clark between 1918 and 1925. Several exceptions to these rules were made to include or exclude peaks based on their preferences; Gray Peak, Wright Peak, Armstrong Mountain, Upper Wolfjaw Mountain, and South Dix were included but did not meet either the prominence or distance rule, while Little Marcy, Yard Mountain, and two then-unnamed peaks were excluded. Later surveys revealed that Blake Peak, Cliff Mountain, Couchsachraga Peak, and Nye Mountain are under 4,000 feet in elevation, but no mountains have been removed or added to the list due to tradition.

Location 
All but three of the peaks are located in central and northern Essex County, primarily south of Lake Placid and Keene Valley. The others are just to the west in Franklin County. All of the summits are on land owned by New York State as part of its Forest Preserve. Forty-two are in a vast tract of nearly  known as the High Peaks Wilderness Area, subdivided into central (26 peaks) and outer (16 peaks) zones. Nine of the peaks in the outer zone are in an area formerly known as the Dix Mountain Wilderness Area, which was added to the High Peaks Wilderness in 2018.  Giant Mountain and Rocky Peak Ridge are in the adjacent Giant Mountain Wilderness Area. Whiteface Mountain and Esther Mountain are set slightly to the north, in Wilmington.

Mountain ranges 
There are many Mountain ranges within the High Peaks. The Dix Range includes five out of the forty-six High Peaks: Macomb, Grace Peak, South Dix, Hough, and Dix Mountain. The Great Range includes seven out of the forty-six High Peaks: Lower Wolfjaw, Upper Wolfjaw, Armstrong, Gothics, Saddleback, Basin, and Haystack. The Seward Range includes four out of the forty-six High Peaks: Seward, Donaldson, Emmons, and Seymour Mountain.  The MacIntyre Range includes four out of the forty-six High Peaks: Mount Marshall, Wright, Algonquin and Iroquois.  The Santanoni Range includes three out of the forty-six High Peaks: Santanoni, Panther, and Couchsachraga.

Ecosystems 
The region contains many alpine lakes and meadows, wetlands, streams, and forests. Atop the highest peaks, above the tree line, lies a small alpine ecosystem, a remnant of a larger lowland tundra that retreated uphill following the most recent period of glaciation. The alpine ecosystem is considered extremely fragile to damage from hikers, and the Adirondack Mountain Club launched an education campaign to avoid further damage in the 1970s, since which some peaks have seen documented recovery.

The Eastern High Peaks Wilderness area is the most regulated area. Fires are not permitted; dogs must be leashed; overnight groups are limited to eight people and day groups to 15; and bear-resistant food canisters are required from April through November. Camping is prohibited above any elevation greater than 4,000 feet on any of the Adirondack High Peaks.

Reaching the summits 
Climbing neither Mount Marcy nor Algonquin Peak, the two highest of the High Peaks, requires technical skills. Of the two, Algonquin Peak is regarded as the more challenging climb. Twenty of the peaks have no official trail to the top, although rough informal routes, commonly referred to as "herd paths," have developed over the years. No true bushwhacking is required on any of the peaks, although some trails are still quite primitive. 

The summit of Whiteface Mountain can alternatively be reached by motor vehicle on the Whiteface Mountain Veterans' Memorial Highway.

The High Peaks 

See also 

Adirondack Park 
Catskill High Peaks
Munro
4000 footers
Northeast 111
Quebec 1000 meter peaks

References

External links 

 Adirondack 46ers
 TrailsNH.com — Current trail conditions and more for the Adirondack High Peaks
 Interactive map of the Adirondack 46 Peaks 
 Sympatico.ca: Adirondack High Peaks

 
Adirondacks

Mountains of Essex County, New York
Mountains of Franklin County, New York
Tourist attractions in Essex County, New York
Tourist attractions in Franklin County, New York
Adirondack Park